The 1970–71 Eredivisie season was the 11th season of the Eredivisie, the top level of ice hockey in the Netherlands. Five teams participated in the league, and the Tilburg Trappers won the championship. The Smoke Eaters Geleen finished first, tied with Tilburg, but the title was awarded to Tilburg due to the Smoke Eaters Geleen using ineligible players.

Regular season

External links
Nederlandse IJshockey Bond

Neth
Eredivisie (ice hockey) seasons